Brenton Bowen (born 21 May 1983 in Cairns, Queensland) is an Australian former professional rugby league footballer who played in the 2000s. He played for the North Queensland Cowboys from 2003 to 2007 and the Gold Coast Titans in 2008. He is a cousin of Australian international  Matt Bowen. Currently is a Deadly Choices Ambassador

Career

Youth
Bowen played junior rugby league with Cairns Brothers in 1999 and Abergowrie College (near Ingham, Queensland), in 2000. Bowen represented Queensland in Under-15 and Under-17 schoolboys teams.

North Queensland Cowboys
Bowen signed with the North Queensland Cowboys making his first grade debut against Manly-Warringah Sea Eagles in March, 2003 and will play out the 2007 season and then join the Gold Coast Titans.

Gold Coast Titans
On Wednesday 20 June it was announced that Bowen would join the Gold Coast Titans for the 2008 season. After that he went to cowboys feeder team northern pride.

Northern Pride/North Queensland Cowboys
In 2010 Bowen signed with North Queensland Cowboys feeder club the Northern Pride.

References

External links
 http://www.northernpride.com.au/
North Queensland Cowboys website
"Cowboys retain winger Bowen" ABC Online, 23 June 2005. Retrieved 27 January 2006.

1983 births
Living people
Australian rugby league players
Gold Coast Titans players
Indigenous Australian rugby league players
North Queensland Cowboys players
Northern Pride RLFC players
Rugby league fullbacks
Rugby league players from Cairns
Rugby league wingers
Tweed Heads Seagulls players